Eudyaria is a genus of moths in the family Saturniidae first described by Harrison Gray Dyar Jr. in 1898.

Species
Eudyaria venata (Butler, 1871)
Eudyaria zeta (Berg, 1885)

References

Hemileucinae